A concept-driven strategy is a process for formulating strategy that draws on the explanation of how humans inquire provided by linguistic pragmatic philosophy. This argues that thinking starts by selecting (explicitly or implicitly) a set of concepts (frames, patterns, lens, principles, etc.) gained from our past experiences. These are used to reflect on whatever happens, or is done, in the future.

Concept-driven strategy therefore starts from agreeing and enacting a set of strategic concepts (organizing principles) that "works best" for an organisation. For example, a hospital might set its strategy as intending to be Caring, World Class, Local, Evidence Based, and Team Based. A University might set its strategy as intending to be Ranked, Problem Solving, Online, Equis, and Offering Pathways. A commercial corporation might set its strategy as intending to be Innovative, Global, Have Visible Supply Chains, Agile and Market Share Dominant. These strategic concepts make up its Statement of Intent (or Purpose).

Background

Much of the strategic management literature mutates Peter Drucker's call for corporations to start the strategic management process by producing a statement of purpose, mission and objectives. This has been mutated into a call to start with a vision, mission and objectives statement. There is an alternative approach which focuses on the Statement of Purpose or Intent. Drucker's example for this statement for a commercial corporation was to state that the corporation's purpose was to create customers. That is, it was going to use the concept of 'customer creation' to coordinate and organise the cognition or mindset of those that worked for the organisation. This was why the corporation existed. Having one concept is now thought to be insufficient. George Armitage Miller's modified The Magical Number Seven, Plus or Minus Two and dialectic suggests a handful of concepts under tension would be preferable.

The Statement of Purpose, Statement of Intent or concept-driven approach to strategy formulation therefore focuses on setting and enacting a set strategic concepts. If a participatory approach is being used these concepts will be acquired through a process of collaboration with stakeholders. Once agreed the strategic concepts can be used to coordinate activities and act as a set of decision making criteria. The set of concepts that make up the Statement of Intent is then used to make sense of an unpredictable future across an organisation in a co-ordinated manner.

Underlying philosophy

Linguistic pragmatism argues that our prior conceptions interpret our perception (sensory inputs). These conceptions are represented by concepts like running, smiling, justice, reasoning and agility. They are patterns of activity, experienced in our past and remembered. They can be named by those with language and so shared.

Bagginni explains pragmatic concepts using the classic example of whether the earth is flat or round.

Another example would be that we can think of the war in Iraq differently by reflecting off the concepts of oil security, Imperialism, aggressive capitalism, liberation or democracy. 
The concept-driven approach to strategy formulation involves setting and using a set of linguistic pragmatic concepts.

Method 

The steps to formulating a participatory concept-driven strategy are:

 Select who the strategy is for exactly, and what exactly is their problem. 
 Reflect on significant events in the past that have impacted on the organisation (past experience matters)
 Identify all stakeholders including suppliers, competitors, staff, alliances, government, environmentalist, industry experts, etc. 
 Ask them what concerns they have for the future relevant to your organisation. Use their experiences and expertise from being involved in the industry.  
 Use idea networking to cluster these stakeholder concern statements into about five clusters
 Name these clusters as strategic concepts (priorities, organizing principles). For example, one cluster of statements might be about innovation, another about becoming more international. 
 Reflect on the possible paradoxical consequences of enacting these strategic concepts
 Draft a one-page 'Statement of Intent' which says the organisation intends to become more like the five or so strategic concepts.
 Draft implementation action plans for each strategic concept. These should be both organisational change actions and investment projects, with goals and milestones. 
 Communicate the 'Statement of Intent' and 'Action Plans' to stakeholders as appropriate.
 Get senior staffs' comments, performance measures, selection criteria and decision criteria to reflect the 'Statement of Intent'.
 In the longer term, reflect on the strategic concepts in the Statement of Intent.

Other terminology
Concept-driven strategy is the name given to a number of similar strategic thinking approaches.

Generally, the term 'concept-driven' is used to encourage a focus on the 'concepts' being used. See Concept learning or Management Concepts.

Some organisations produce a 'statement of intent' with little thought as to the concepts it contains. However, if it is a short list of concepts, high level objectives, principles, priorities or frames, then concept-driven strategy offers a philosophical basis for these statements.

Some organisations produce a 'strategic principles' statement which again is similar to a statement of intent and the same applies about the concepts approach offering a philosophical basis. The term 'strategic priorities' or 'strategic values' are often used in the same way as strategic principles.

The literature about 'corporate purpose' is also similar to that of strategic intent. Sometimes, purpose refers to present actions and intent to future ones. If purpose is expressed as a set of concepts, then the concepts approach again provides some philosophical basis.

There is a connection between 'systems thinking' and concept-driven strategy. The Churchman/Ackoff stream of systems thinking was interested in a developing generic system of concepts for thinking about problems. Rather than a generic set of concepts, the concept-driven approach uses whatever concepts stakeholders think work best for the future of their organisation.

There is a military planning approach called 'concept-led'. The military-like leadership seems to have moved the concepts from being drivers to be leaders. There seems to be very little difference otherwise.

In turbulent environments, concepts are thought 'more flexible than objectives' (goals, targets) as they provide why certain actions are preferable. The purpose and intent literature likes to distinguish itself from the objectives literature by saying purpose and intent provide the reasons for (why change), the driver for change. Objectives are where you end up. In complex dynamic situations, there may be many acceptable end points, many of which cannot be anticipated by planners. Arguably the only objective is to survive. How is explained in the statement of intent.

Perhaps strangely, there is a connection between 'metaphor', metaphoric criticism, or conceptual metaphor and concept-driven strategy. Pragmatic concepts are not images but most concepts relate to metaphors. For example, to say an organisation is like a machine, with cogs, or like an adaptive organism, is to use the concepts of machine and organism to reflect on organisations. Much of what has been written about the usefulness of metaphors in planning applies to concepts.

The term 'strategic frames' is not common given the extensive literature on frame analysis but frames and pragmatic concepts seem to be very similar. Amos Tversky defines a frame as a conception of outcomes.

The system of strategic concepts listed in a statement of intent, purpose, principles, frames or conceptual metaphor are organizing principle(s).

Also, as Karl Weick explains sensemaking as the process of conceptualising problems, concept-driven strategy might be thought of as a pragmatic means of sensemaking a strategy.

See also
Bounded rationality
Framing (social sciences)
Institutional logic
Interactive planning
Letter of intent
Sensemaking
Strategic planning
Wicked problem

References

Further reading
Ackoff, R.L. 1970. A concept of corporate planning Wiley., New York:.

Carter, P.D. 2002. Building Purposeful Action: Action Methods and Action Research. Educational Action Research 10(2) 207-232.
Gustavsen, B., B. Hofmaier, M. Ekman Philips, A. Wikman. 1996. A Concept-Driven Development and the Organization of the Process of Change. John Benjamins, Amsterdam.
Margolis, E.L., Stephen. 2010. Concepts Stanford Encyclopedia of Philosophy http://plato.stanford.edu/entries/concepts/. Stanford University, California.

Planning
Pragmatics
Pragmatism
Concepts
Strategy
Cognition